The 1988 VFL draft, held on the 9th of November 1988, was the third annual national draft held by the Victorian Football League (now known as the Australian Football League). It consisted of a pre-season draft and a national draft.

In 1988 there were 112 picks to be drafted between 14 teams in the national draft. The Hawthorn Football Club received the first pick in the national draft, after receiving it from St Kilda in the first ever trade involving draft picks, in return for Paul Harding, Peter Russo and Robert Handley.

Pre-draft selections

1988 national draft

1989 pre-season draft

References

External links
 Official AFL draft page 

Australian Football League draft
VFL Draft
VFL Draft